Sintija Greijere (born 23 October 1980) is a Latvian former footballer who played as a forward. She has been a member of the Latvia women's national team.

References

1980 births
Living people
Women's association football forwards
Latvian women's footballers
Latvia women's international footballers
Gintra Universitetas players
FK Liepājas Metalurgs (women) players
Latvian expatriate footballers
Latvian expatriate sportspeople in Lithuania
Expatriate women's footballers in Lithuania